KTAV-LD, virtual channel 35 (UHF digital channel 21), is a low-powered television station licensed to Los Angeles, California, United States. The station is owned by Almavision.

History
KTAV-LD originally went on the air on September 23, 1992, as translator K31DN on channel 31. On April 15, 1998, the station moved to channel 68 as K68FR. On March 23, 2001, the station moved to channel 24 as K24FG.

The station then changed its callsign to KTAV-LP on analog channel 69 until October 28, 2011, when the Federal Communications Commission authorized the station to convert to digital (as KTAV-LD) and move to channel 46. In July 2020, as part of the FCC's spectrum repack, the station moved to channel 21.

Digital channels
The station's digital signal is multiplexed:

References

External links

Altadena, California
Television channels and stations established in 1992
Low-power television stations in the United States
TAV-LD